Tabasaran (also written Tabassaran) is a Northeast Caucasian language of the Lezgic branch. It is spoken by the Tabasaran people in the southern part of the Russian Republic of Dagestan. There are two main dialects: North (Khanag) and South Tabasaran. It has a literary language based on the Southern dialect, one of the official languages of Dagestan.

Tabasaran is an ergative language. The verb system is relatively simple; verbs agree with the subject in number, person and (in North Tabasaran) class. North Tabasaran has two noun classes (that is, grammatical gender), whereas Southern Tabasaran lacks noun classes / gender.

Geographical distribution
It is spoken in the basin of Upper Rubas-nir and Upper Chirakh-nir.

Phonology

Consonants 

The post-alveolar sibilants may be whistled.

Vowels 

Vowel sounds of Tabasaran are [i, y, ɛ, æ, ɑ, u].

Writing system
Tabasaran is written using Cyrillic since 1938 (from 1928 to 1938 the Latin alphabet was used as a base for the Tabasaran writing system).

Note: The letters indicated in orange are encountered only in loanwords from Russian.

Grammar
It is highly probable that Tabasaran is  an active language of the fluid-S type.

Tabasaran was listed in the Guinness Book of World Records as having the largest case system in the world, with 48. Hjelmslev (1935) claimed that Tabasaran had the 'empirical maximum' number of cases, with 52 (though 2 occur only on adjectives). However, such claims are based on a sloppy analysis of 'case', and other languages such as Tsez would have even larger counts under such definitions. Comrie & Polinsky 
(1998) analyze the system as having 14 case morphemes (counting the absolutive with no suffix) in southern dialects (including the standard language) and 15 in northern dialects.
These include 4 core/argument cases (absolutive, ergative, genitive -n and dative -z). The absolutive is the citation form. The ergative, which may be irregular but typically ends in -i, functions as the stem for all other cases.
There are also 7 or 8 locative case suffixes: -ɂ 'in', -xy 'at', -h 'near / in front' (neutralized with 'at' in the south), -ɂin 'on' (horizontal), -k 'on' (vertical), -kk 'under', -q 'behind' and  'among'. The locative cases may take an additional suffix, allative -na or ablative -an, for 21 or 24 combinations. All of these, as well as the dative, can take a further suffix -di to mark the location as less specific, for 47 (southern) to 53 (northern) combinations of case suffixes.

Samples 
Uwu aldakurawu. "Уву алдакураву." — "You are falling."

Uzuz uwu kkunduzuz. "Узуз уву ккундузуз." — "I love you."

Uwu fudžuwa? "Уву фужува?" — "Who are you?"

Fici wuna? "Фици вуна?" — "How are you?"

Zakur ʕürza. "Закур гъюрза." — "I'll come tomorrow."

Uzu kana qheza. "Узу кана хъэза." — "I'll be back."

References 

Chanmagomedov, B.G.-K. & K.T. Šalbuzov, Tabasaransko-russkij slovarʼ, Moskva: Ilim, 2001,  [Includes outline of Tabasaran grammar (Grammatičeskij očerk tabasaranskogo jazyka) by K.K. Kurbanov (p. 395-476)]
Alekseev, Mixail E. and Sabrina X. Shixalieva. 2003. Tabasaranskij Jazyk. Moskva: Nauka.

External links 

 Tabasaran dictionary online from IDS (select simple or advanced browsing)
 Entry in the Red Book of the Peoples of the Russian Empire
 Sample text
 Description at Languages of the World
 Entry at the Rosetta Project
 Tabasaran basic lexicon at the Global Lexicostatistical Database
 Tabasaran DoReCo corpus compiled by Natalia Bogomolova, Dmitry Ganenkov and Nils Norman Schiborr. Audio recordings of narrative texts with transcriptions time-aligned at the phone level, translations, and time-aligned morphological annotations.

Agglutinative languages
Lezgian languages
Northeast Caucasian languages
Languages of Russia
Dagestan